The Polish-Catholic Church in United Kingdom is a Polish Old Catholic church in United Kingdom registered under number SC594199.

History
The Polish-Catholic Church in Great Britain was initiated by the faithful from the Polish-Catholic Parish of Our Lady of Czestochowa in Glasgow in April 2018, who wanting to avoid disputes between the authorities of the Old Catholic Church in the Republic of Poland to which they belonged, decided to establish a church in Great Britain. The church currently has only one parish, two chapels and a group of believers of the Belarusian language. Bishop Andrew Hall was chosen as the church's superior on April 12, 2018. He embraced this position until July 31, 2018.

Clergy

List of superiors
 August 1, 2018 – May 12, 2019 – Archbishop Arthur Wiecinski
 April 12–July 31, 2018 – Bishop Andrew Hall

See also
 Polish Old Catholicism
 Polish-Catholic Church of Republic of Poland
 Old Catholic Church in Poland
 Polish National Catholic Church

References

External links

Polish-Catholic Church in UK (pl)

Independent Catholic denominations
United Kingdom
Christian organizations established in 2018
2018 establishments in the United Kingdom
Old Catholic denominations